Marvin Comisky (1918–2010) was a major figure in the Philadelphia legal community for decades. Chairman emeritus of the law firm Blank Rome and former head of the Philadelphia and state bar associations, he halted discriminatory hiring practices in Philadelphia law firms, and is one of few attorneys to be regarded as a legend in the profession., 

Cominsky was a law graduate of the University of Pennsylvania. He served in the United States Army during World War II.

References

1918 births
2010 deaths
Lawyers from Philadelphia
Temple University alumni
University of Pennsylvania Law School alumni
United States Army personnel of World War II
Place of birth missing
20th-century American lawyers